El Gráfico may refer to:

 El Gráfico (Argentina),  an Argentine sports magazine
 El Gráfico (El Salvador), a Salvadoran sports newspaper